Francisco Mendoza (died 1543) was a Roman Catholic prelate who served as Bishop of Jaén (1538–1543).

Biography
Francisco Mendoza was born in Granada, Spain.
On 14 Jun 1538, he was appointed during the papacy of Pope Paul III as Bishop of Jaén.
He served as Bishop of Jaén until his death in 1543 in Speyer, Germany.

References

External links and additional sources
 (for Chronology of Bishops) 
 (for Chronology of Bishops) 

16th-century Roman Catholic bishops in Spain
Bishops appointed by Pope Paul III
1543 deaths